Sudiang Sports Hall (Indonesian: Gedung Olahraga Sudiang) or commonly known as is GOR Sudiang a multifunction sports arena in Biringkanaya, Makassar, South Sulawesi, Indonesia. This arena can be used for basketball, badminton, volleyball, futsal, and taekwondo venues.

References

Makassar
Sports venues in Indonesia
Indoor arenas in Indonesia
Badminton venues
Badminton in Indonesia